Presidential elections were held in Belarus on 23 June 1994, with a second round on 10 July.  They were the first national elections held in Belarus since the country seceded from the Soviet Union three years earlier.  The result was a victory for Alexander Lukashenko, who received 80.6% of the vote in the second round. Voter turnout was 79.0% in the first round and 70.6% in the second.

In 1995, a year after taking office, Lukashenko won a referendum that gave him the power to dissolve the legislature. In 1996, he won another referendum that dramatically increased his power, and also extended his original five-year term to 2001. As a result, the 1994 presidential election is considered, to date, the only free election held in Belarus since it broke away from the Soviet Union.

Results

Maps

References

Presidential elections in Belarus
Belarus
President